Mads Reinholdt Rasmussen (born 24 November 1981 in Idestrup on Falster) is a Danish rower and double World Champion and Olympic Gold winner in the lightweight double sculls, with his partner Rasmus Quist Hansen. Rasmussen and Quist placed fourth in the 2004 Summer Olympics in Athens, third in the 2008 Summer Olympics in Beijing, and first in the 2012 Summer Olympics in London.

References 
 
 

1981 births
Living people
Danish male rowers
Olympic rowers of Denmark
Rowers at the 2004 Summer Olympics
Rowers at the 2008 Summer Olympics
Rowers at the 2012 Summer Olympics
Rowers at the 2016 Summer Olympics
Olympic gold medalists for Denmark
Olympic bronze medalists for Denmark
Olympic medalists in rowing
Medalists at the 2012 Summer Olympics
Medalists at the 2008 Summer Olympics
World Rowing Championships medalists for Denmark
People from Guldborgsund Municipality
Sportspeople from Region Zealand